The Nevis Island Assembly is the devolved local legislative body for the island of Nevis within the Federation of St Kitts and Nevis.

The Assembly has a total of eight members. Five are directly elected in single-member constituencies using the first-past-the-post system. Three are appointed. Members serve five-year terms.

The Nevis Island Assembly meets in Charlestown on the second floor of Museum of Nevis History building.

Mark Brantley has been Premier of Nevis since the 2017 election after leading the Concerned Citizens' Movement to victory.

Presidents of the Assembly

Election results

|-
! style="background-color:#E9E9E9;text-align:left;" |Parties
! style="background-color:#E9E9E9;text-align:right;" |Votes
! style="background-color:#E9E9E9;text-align:right;" |%
! style="background-color:#E9E9E9;text-align:right;" |Seats
|-
| style="text-align:left;vertical-align:top;" |Concerned Citizens' Movement
| style="vertical-align:top;" |3,930
| style="vertical-align:top;" |52.4%
| style="vertical-align:top;" |3
|-
| style="text-align:left;vertical-align:top;" |Nevis Reformation Party 
| style="vertical-align:top;" |3,543
| style="vertical-align:top;" |47.2%
| style="vertical-align:top;" |2
|-
| style="text-align:left;vertical-align:top;" |Moral Restoration Movement
| style="vertical-align:top;" |28
| style="vertical-align:top;" |0.4%
| style="vertical-align:top;" |0
|-
| style="text-align:left;vertical-align:top;" colspan="3" |Appointed members
| style="vertical-align:top;" |3
|-
|style="background-color:#E9E9E9;text-align:left;vertical-align:top;"|Total
|width="75" style="text-align:right;background-color:#E9E9E9"|7,501
|width="30" style="text-align:right;background-color:#E9E9E9"|
|width="50" style="text-align:right;background-color:#E9E9E9"|8
|}

In the election the CCM lost a seat (St James') to the NRP.

Results by parish constituency

See also
Nevis Island Administration

References

External links
Nevis Island Assembly

Politics of Saint Kitts and Nevis
Political organisations based in Saint Kitts and Nevis
Nevis
Nevis
Nevis
1983 establishments in Saint Kitts and Nevis